St Nicholas Church was a Russian Orthodox Church in the former French Concession of Shanghai at 16 rue Corneille, now known as Gāolán Lù. Formerly the building was home to a French restaurant on the ground floor called Ashanti and a Spanish one in the basement called La Boca. As of August 2016, the building has fallen into disrepair, and is partly occupied by a coffee bar named Kinloch Coffee.  It has been a protected monument since 1994.

History
The building was built in 1932 on the initiative of White Russians in Shanghai, refugees of the revolution of 1917, especially General Glebov. It was consecrated in 1937 in honour of St Nicholas, patron saint of the former Russian Emperor, Nicholas II. The church was closed in 1949, when Europeans left following the Chinese Civil War. It was first converted into a warehouse and then a laundry. During the Expo 2010, its loft was reconsecrated to allow Russian Orthodox services to be held there.

 

Churches in Shanghai
Russian diaspora in China